Praia Santa Eulália is a beach within the Municipality of Albufeira, in the Algarve, Portugal. In 2012 Praia Santa Eulália has been designated a blue Flag beach.

Description
Praia Santa Eulália is a popular rosie beach  in the eastern outskirts of the resort town of Albufeira. This well kept beach has blue flag status(2012). The beach is wide with fine golden sand and backed by golden cliffs with a number of nooks and crannies provided by the various rock formations. To the west side of the beach a seasonal watercourse runs down to the sea which is completely dry for the majority of the time.

Car Park

To the back of the beach there is a large car park of which some there are allocated parking bays for disabled drivers displaying a European blue badge. Parking can prove very difficult during the busy summer months. From the car park there is a boardwalk down to, and along the beach which provides easy access for wheelchair users.

Facilities
The beach has good access for the disabled having boardwalks running east and west along the back of the beach from the central car park. During the summer season the beach is patrolled by lifeguards. There are Loungers, parasols and Pedalo's which can be hired. There is also a selection of beach bars, shops and restaurants on or close to the beach. There are showers and toilets available loa Just of the beach many types of water sports can be enjoyed, such as Windsurfing, water skiing sailing or cruising. On the cliffs above the beach is the 5 star Grande Real Santa Eulália Resort & Hotel Spa. This hotel has been awarded a prestigious Green Key, which is a European Union eco-label award.

Gallery

References

External links

Albufeira Beaches

Beaches of Albufeira
Blue Flag beaches of Portugal